She Teaches Defeat is the second release from Canadian post-hardcore band Lights Below, released on September 4, 2007. This was their last release prior to their break-up several months later.

Track listing
 Bad Dudes
 Jaguar Shark
 Here's Lookin' At You J-Mo
 Gentlemen, You Can't Fight In Here (This Is The War Room)
 Big Country
 The Crystal Brawl
 Everybody In 1955 Was On Fire
 The Crowsnest

Singles
 Bad Dudes

Trivia
 The song title "Bad Dudes" was taken from the 1988 Nintendo release by the same name. The game was based around the kidnapping of US President Ronnie by ninjas. To save him, the government turn to Blade & Striker - a couple of 'Bad Dudes'. A 'Bad Dude' is also a popular alcoholic drink.
 The song title "Everybody In 1955 Was On Fire" was a quote from Peter Griffin on the television show Family Guy.
 The song title "Gentlemen, You Can't Fight in Here (This is the War Room)" is from the film Dr. Strangelove or: How I Learned to Stop Worrying and Love the Bomb.
 Demos for tracks 3,4, 6, and 7 were made available on the band's MySpace profile months previous to the album's release.

Lights Below albums
2007 albums